Keeranur 624617 is a panchayat town in Dindigul district in the Indian state of Tamil Nadu. It is situated between Palani and Dharapuram. There are more than three places in Tamil Nadu and in the rest of India with the same name,  a bigger Keeranur situated near Trichy.

Demographics 

At the 2001 census, Keeranur had a population of 6,299, with males constituting 49% of the population and females 51%. 12% of the population is under 6 years of age.

Keeranur has an average literacy rate of 57%, lower than the national average of 59.5%; male literacy is 63%, and female literacy is 50%.

The major Hindu communities are Samban, Islam and Naidu.

Education
A higher secondary school, middle school, primary school and a girls' school are located in this village. Samarasa Sudda Sanmarga Sangam was formed by Ramalinga Vallalar, is now under the management of Kuppuswamy. The S. K. education foundation helps financially disadvantaged students from all communities.

Occupation
The main occupation of this village is Agriculture. More than 65% of the population is involved in the agriculture industry. About  of wetlands are available at the Shanmuga river basin. A tank Alangulam holds seasonal water for agricultural purposes.

Religion
In Keeranur Hindus, Muslims and Christians live together in harmony.

There are several Hindu temples in the area. The old temple in keeranur village Thirumalai Bahavan.  

Keeranur has a prominent old mosque called Big Mosque(MMPS) which has two very high minarets, which is also called as "Chinna Mecca".

An old Christian church fell to ruin, although a small church is constructed.

References

External links 
 , article in The Hindu about Keeranur

Cities and towns in Dindigul district